Daniel Wise (1813-1898) was a Methodist Episcopal clerical author, born in Portsmouth, England.  He entered the United States in 1833, and became a pastor (1837-52).  He worked as an editor of Zion's Herald (1852–56), and corresponding secretary of the Sunday School Union and Tract Society of his church (1856–72).  Part of his duty as secretary was to edit all the publications of the society.  From 1872, he was occupied in literary work.  He published more than 40 books, including:  
 Christian Love: or Charity An Essential Element of True Christian Character (1847)
 The Path of Life (1847)  
 Precious Lessons from the Lips of Jesus (1854)
 The Saintly and Successful Worker (1879)  
 Heroic Methodists of the Olden Time (1882)  
 Our Missionary Heroes and Heroines (1884)  
 Young Knights of the Cross (1887)  
 Faith, Hope, Love, and Duty (1891)
 ''Bridal Greetings: A Marriage Gift, In Which the Mutual Duties of Husband and Wife are Familiarly Illustrated and Enforced (1850)

References

External links
 
 
About children's series by Wise

1813 births
1898 deaths
Writers from Portsmouth
American Methodists
American theologians
British emigrants to the United States